Scotty Cranmer (born January 11, 1987) is an American BMX rider. He is tied with Dave Mirra for the most X Games BMX Park medals with nine, three each in gold, silver and bronze over fourteen appearances. He attended Jackson Memorial High School. Nicknamed "the Bulldozer", he is sponsored by Vans Shoes, Hyper Bike Co., Fox Clothing, Pro-tec Helmets, Monster Energy Drink and Snafu. He owns a bike shop in Howell, NJ called SC Action Sports Bicycle Shop. He is also widely known for having a YouTube channel under the name Scotty Cranmer in which he makes videos with his friends riding skateparks, driving cars, and playing games while riding their bikes.  His younger brother Matty is a regular guest on the channel. As of June 2021, the channel has accumulated over 1.71 million subscribers and 500 million total views since releasing his first video in September 2015.

Injury
On October 12, 2016, during a session, Cranmer suffered a spinal cord injury. He rolled into a hole in the ground after landing a trick on his bike, flipping over and landing on his head. Even though he was wearing a helmet, he still injured his head and some of his vertebrae.

He made a partial recovery and has been largely able-bodied since, but as of 2020 he is still partially paralyzed. While he can do some rudimentary tricks on a BMX bike and regularly rides a bike for leisure and exercise, he no longer rides BMX competitively.

However, Cranmer has kept his career in BMX going through other means. He still runs SC Action Sports, releases videos regularly on his YouTube channel, mentors younger riders, and has been a commentator in numerous large-scale BMX events, including the X Games.

Career highlights
 X Games XVIII Gold Medal in Park 
 X Games XV Gold Medal in Park
 X Games XII Gold Medal in Park
 X Games Munich 2013 Silver in Park
 X Games 2007 Silver Medal in Park 
 X Games 2005 Silver Medal in Park 
 Landed the first ever frontflip-tailwhip in competition
 Landed the first ever seat stand front flip on his YouTube channel 
 AST Dew Tour – Toyota Challenge – 1st
 BMX Masters
 AST Dew Tour – Panasonic Open – 3rd
 AST Dew Tour – Right Guard Open – 8th
 AST Dew Tour – Vans Invitational – 2nd 
 AST Dew Tour – Toyota Challenge – 2nd
 AST Dew Tour – PlayStation Pro – 1st
 AST Dew Tour – Yearend Overall – 2nd
 Bike 2005 Birmingham, England – 2nd
 Vans “Let it Ride” Las Vegas – 1st
 AST Dew Tour – Panasonic Open – 1st
 AST Dew Tour – Right Guard Open – 15th
 AST Dew Tour – Vans Invitational – 2nd
 AST Dew Tour – Toyota Challenge – 1st
 The Cool Challenge – Espens Challenge – 1st

References 

1987 births
BMX riders
Living people
Sportspeople from Jackson Township, New Jersey
X Games athletes
American male cyclists
Jackson Memorial High School alumni
21st-century American people